Michael James Connelly (October 16, 1935 – October 4, 2021) was an American professional football player who was an offensive lineman in the National Football League (NFL) for the Dallas Cowboys and Pittsburgh Steelers. He played college football at Utah State University and was drafted in the 12th round of the 1959 NFL Draft by the Los Angeles Rams.

Early years
Connelly attended Pasadena High School, where he practiced football and baseball. He accepted a scholarship from Washington State University, playing freshman football. He then transferred to Pasadena City College for one season.

He later signed for a 2-year stint with the United States Marine Corps, before moving on to play football at Utah State University from 1958 to 1959, where he was a two-way player, center/guard on offense and linebacker on defense. He garnered All-Skyline conference honors as a senior.

Professional career

Los Angeles Rams
Connelly was selected by the Los Angeles Rams in the 12th round (141st overall) of the 1959 NFL Draft, with a future draft pick, which allowed the team to draft him before his college eligibility was over. He was also selected by the Buffalo Bills in the 1960 AFL Draft. He was released by the Rams at the end of the 1960 preseason.

Dallas Cowboys
On September 9, 1960, he was claimed off waivers by the Dallas Cowboys. He started as a backup guard, before being switched over to center in 1961, becoming the starter there for four straight years. Connelly was very quick for his position and as an avid weightlifter, becoming one of the strongest players on the team.

In 1965 after Dave Manders won the starting position, he started to serve as a backup center and guard. An injury to Manders put Connelly back in the starting lineup during all of the 1967 season, which included the Championship game against the Green Bay Packers, popularly known as the Ice Bowl.

He reported to training camp in 1968 and told head coach Tom Landry that he'd only play one more year. The next day he was traded to the Pittsburgh Steelers for kicker Mike Clark.

Pittsburgh Steelers
Connelly true to his word, played only in the 1968 season before retiring.

References

External links
Former Dallas Cowboy Mike Connelly stays centered for the long run

1935 births
2021 deaths
Players of American football from Pasadena, California
American football offensive linemen
Pasadena City Lancers football players
Washington State Cougars football players
Utah State Aggies football players
Los Angeles Rams players
Dallas Cowboys players
Pittsburgh Steelers players
Pasadena High School (California) alumni